Havelock station may refer to:

Havelock MRT station, an under-construction rapid transit station in Singapore
Havelock railway station, a former railway station in Ontario, Canada